Hoël I of Brittany was an illegitimate son of Alan II and Judith. He was Count of Nantes and Duke of Brittany from 960 to 981.

Life
Upon the death of Drogo, the government of Brittany splintered among the leading nobles. Evidence of a fractured leadership appeared in letters from Pope John XIII to Brittany who addressed "Juhel Béranger  and his son Conan, as well as Hoël and his brother Guérech."

In 975,  Hoël I entered into a conflict with Conan I Le Tort, the Count of Rennes, son of Juhel Béranger and the eventual Duke of Brittany after the rule of Hoël  and his brother Guérech. Conan I controlled the north of Brittany and considered himself the ruler of Brittany. Hoël's army was supplemented by the troops of Geoffrey I of Anjou while Conan I's army was supported by the forces of the House of Blois.  A battle ensued at Conquereuil where Geoffrey defeated Conan I, although the military result of the battle was indecisive, as different results are recorded in the Chronicles of Nantes and Mont St Michel. 

In 981, Hoël I worked to have his brother Guérech elected Bishop of Nantes to replace Gauthier I who had died.

Family
The name of Hoël I's spouse is unknown. He had at least two known children:
 Judicaël (c 979 - 1004) - he became Count of Nantes and was the father of Budic and Judith of Nantes
 Hoël

Death
In 981, during Guérech's visit to the Metropolitan of Tours, who controlled all bishops in Brittany, Hoël I was assassinated by Galuron under the orders of Conan I. Guérech left his bishopric of Nantes before being consecrated Bishop and was elected Count of Nantes.

Notes

References

Supplemental Reading
 
 

981 deaths
10th-century dukes of Brittany
Counts of Nantes
Dukes of Brittany
Year of birth unknown
French murder victims
Assassinated nobility